Tõnu Tepandi (born 4 July 1948 in Tallinn) is an Estonian actor, singer, teacher, theatre pedagogue, politician, and an Estonian social figure.

Education and work
1955–1966 he attended Tallinn 2. Secondary School. 1966–1970 he attended Tallinn Conservatory, Performing Arts Department, actor specialty.

1970–1983 he was actor of Vanemuine Theater. 1983–1987 he was actor of the Estonian National Youth Theater.

From 1985 he is lecturer of voice engineering at Estonian Academy of Music and Theatre, School of Performing Arts (since 2006 professor).

1987–1992 he was related to humor organization called Aara (:et).

From 1987 he is freelance actor.

1994–1997 Deputy Chairman of the Cultural Endowment of Estonia and Chairman of the Endowment of Applied Arts.

1997–2008 worked as a lecturer at Viljandi Culture Academy, Estonian Institute of Humanities, Estonian Academy of Arts.

1996–1998 he was chairman of the jury of the Estonian Drama Festival.

1992–1999 he was member of Riigikogu.

1994–2000 he was chairman of the Estonian Theater Association.

Books
Alguses on hääl ("There is a Voice at First")

Music
Concerts:
"Mu kodu on punaste pihlade all" ("My home is under red stalks") Vanemuine, 1977
"Süda on mul vaevas" ("My heart is troubled") Vanemuine, 1980
"Tepandi ja Vanapagana lood" ("Tepandi, the Devil and their stories") Youth Theater, 1985

Film Music:
"Lõppematu päev" ("An Endless Day") 1971, by Virve Aruoja and Jaan Tooming, music by Tõnu Tepandi and Olav Ehala

Albums
LP "Tõnu Tepandi laulud" ("Songs of Tõnu Tepandi"), 1982
CD "Kõlakoda" ("The Chalet"), 2003

Important roles
Romulus – Friedrich Dürrenmatt "Romulus Suur" ("Romulus the Great"), TRK Stage Artist, 1970
Ullike – Evald Hermaküla "Üks ullike läks rändama" ("One ullike went on a journey"), Vanemuine 1973
Andrei Buslai – Aleksey Dudarev "Üle läve" ("Over the threshold"), Ugala theatre, 1984
George – John Steinbeck "Hiirtest ja inimestest" ("Mice and People"), Ugala theatre, 1993
Horace Vandergelder – "Hallo, Dolly!" By Jerry Herman, Estonian National Opera, 1996
Henry Higgins – George Bernard Shaw "Pygmalion", Ugala theatre, 2000
Domenico Soriano – Eduardo de Filippo "Abielu Itaalia moodi" ("Italian Wedding"), Ugala theatre, 2001
Fellbom – Max Lundgren "Unistus Mallorcast" ("Dream of Majorca"), Ugala theatre, 2001
Father and father-in-law – Vaino Vahing "Suvekool" ("Summer School"), Rakvere Theatre, 2003
Juhan Luiga – Katri Kaasik-Aaslav and Vaino Vahing "Teatriromanss" ("Theater Romance") National Opera of Estonia, 2004
Olovernes – A. H. Tammsaare  "Juudit" ("Jew"), Estonian National Opera, 2006
President Konstantin Päts – "President 1939" by Katri Aaslav-Tepandi and Tõnu Tepandi, Estonian National Opera, 2008

Acknowledgements
Order of the White Star, V Class 2002

Personal life
From 1969, Tõnu Tepandi was married to artist Tiiu Tepandi.

References 

1948 births
Living people
Estonian male stage actors
Estonian male film actors
Male actors from Tallinn
Estonian Academy of Music and Theatre alumni
Recipients of the Order of the White Star, 5th Class
20th-century Estonian male actors
21st-century Estonian male actors
Members of the Riigikogu, 1992–1995
Members of the Riigikogu, 1995–1999